Konstantinos Varouxis (Greek: Κωνσταντίνος Βαρουξής) was a Greek journalist and a publisher.

Varouxis was born in Pyrgos and was descended from a family of journalists.  The family had familial ties with the Spilotopoulos family from Dimitsana, which participated the Greek War of Independence of 1821.  In 1892, he ran the weekly paper Avgi.  Varouxis was exiled in Lefkada in 1895.  He stood trial on the island and was found innocent. In the same year he ceased publishing Avgis and from 1910 started to publish the Ileia newspaper.  That ended in 1915. He stopped writing entirely in 1931.

References
Vyronas Davos Sto Pyrgo kai stin Ileia tou 1821-1930 (Στον Πύργο και στην Ηλεία του 1821–1930, = In Pyrgos And In Ilia From 1821-1930), Athens 1996
Patris, Pyrgos 2003
Vyron Davos Newspapers Of Ilia, in Patris, Pyrgos, 2003

Greek journalists
People from Pyrgos, Elis
Year of birth missing
Year of death missing